Stewart Cathey Jr. (born April 19, 1981) is an American politician and businessman from the state of Louisiana. A Republican, Cathey has represented the 33rd district of the Louisiana State Senate, covering Monroe and surrounding areas, since 2020.

Background
After graduating from the University of Louisiana at Monroe, Cathey joined the U.S. Army in 2003, where he served as a commissioned officer and army engineer. He deployed for a second time in 2016. Cathey has additionally worked as a managing partner at the Cathey Group since 2013.

Political career
In 2015, Cathey ran for the 35th district of the Louisiana State Senate, losing to fellow Republican James Fannin. Cathey ran again for the State Senate in 2019, this time in the neighboring 33rd district, and defeated Republican former West Monroe Chamber of Commerce chairman Wade Bishop with 52% of the vote.

References

Living people
1981 births
People from Ouachita Parish, Louisiana
People from Monroe, Louisiana
Republican Party Louisiana state senators
University of Louisiana at Monroe alumni
21st-century American politicians